The 1984-85 NBA season was the Kings 36th season in the NBA and their 13th and final season in the city of Kansas City. The Kings finished with a 31-51 record, placing them in sixth place in the Midwest Division, and in a three-way tie for ninth place in the NBA's Western Conference, along with the Seattle SuperSonics and the Los Angeles Clippers. As a result, the Kings did not qualify for the NBA Playoffs in their final season in Kansas City, and relocated to the California capital of Sacramento after the season.

Draft picks

Roster

Regular season

Season standings

z - clinched division title
y - clinched division title
x - clinched playoff spot

Record vs. opponents

Game log

Player statistics

Awards and records

Transactions

References

See also
 1984-85 NBA season

Sacramento Kings seasons
K
Kansas City
Kansas City